Sierra Towers is a residential 31-story high-rise condominium building in West Hollywood, California, United States. located at 9255 Doheny Road, adjacent to Beverly Hills. It was designed by the renowned Beverly Hills mid-century modern  architect Jack A. Charney, who studied under Richard Neutra and Rudolph Schindler. Completed in 1965 as an apartment building, it was originally called the Spoon Apartment Building. Building amenities include 24-hour security, concierge service, a gym, and an outdoor swimming pool.

Construction
Sierra Towers was developed for $12 million by Walter and Leo Minskoff, whose family firm also built New York's Minskoff Theatre. The building is known for being more than 15 stories taller than any other building within a  radius.  Due to Sierra Towers' unique positioning at the base of a hill (the same hill from which Beverly Hills gets its name), the building is the highest residential tower in the greater Los Angeles Area relative to sea level. The building is said to get its plural name from scuttled original plans to build a second tower.

Notable residents
Sierra Towers was first operated as a rental property, but following its purchase by New York real estate investor Helmsley Spear Inc., the building was converted to condominiums in 1974. A number of celebrities own condominiums in the 146-unit building, including Karyn White, Lily Collins, Diahann Carroll, Sandra Bullock, Kelly Osbourne, Vincent Gallo, PJ Harvey, Robert Sherman, Jim Morris, Brody Jenner, Emma Watson, and Meg Whitman.

Historically, residents and owners have included Joan Collins, Matthew Perry, Lindsay Lohan, Rachel Zoe, Evander Holyfield, Peter Lawford, Fred Durst, Sidney Poitier, Jack Webb, Bobby Jameson, George Hamilton, David Geffen, Bill Shoemaker, Nino Tempo, Edith Flagg, and Reem Al Faisal. Actress Patty Duke also lived in the building. Former resident Elton John and partner David Furnish commissioned designer Martyn Lawrence-Bullard to create a 1970s-inspired design for the apartment which features kelly green walls and a chandelier from the Grand Hotel et de Milan in the kitchen.

In 2013, singer-actress Cher sold her  two-story condominium, created by combining two one-bedroom units on the 26th and 27th floors, for $5.25 million. In early 2014, Sandra Bullock purchased a  unit in the southeast corner of the building's 22nd floor for $3.35 million; she bought a second,  unit on the 20th floor $5.13 million in 2017. Joan Collins's former  residence on the 25th floor was sold for $4.4 million in 2017. In 2020, Courteney Cox sold her  unit on the same floor for $2.9 million.

In 2021, the Wall Street Journal reported that Evan Metropoulos, a principal at his family’s investment firm Metropoulos & Co., had spent around $30 million to buy two units totalling  in 2012 and then in 2015.

In popular culture 
In the 2013 video game Grand Theft Auto V and Grand Theft Auto Online, the Sierra Towers appears as the "Eclipse Towers" in the fictional city of Los Santos, based on Los Angeles.

References

Buildings and structures in West Hollywood, California
Condominium conversions
Culture of Hollywood, Los Angeles
Residential buildings completed in 1965
Residential condominiums in the United States
Residential skyscrapers in Los Angeles